The Redlin Art Center is an art gallery located in Watertown, South Dakota where over 150 of artist Terry Redlin's original paintings are displayed. The center was opened on June 6, 1997, and has welcomed over two million visitors.  This  brick building was designed by Terry Redlin's son, Charles Redlin.

External links

 Redlin Art Center Official Site

Art museums and galleries in South Dakota
Buildings and structures in Watertown, South Dakota
Tourist attractions in Codington County, South Dakota
Art museums established in 1997
1997 establishments in the United States